The 1994 season was São Paulo's 65th season since club's existence.

Statistics

Scorers

Managers performance

Overall

{|class="wikitable"
|-
|Games played || 92 (30 Campeonato Paulista, 1 Recopa Sudamericana, 8 Copa Libertadores, 6 Copa Bandeirantes, 27 Campeonato Brasileiro, 6 Supercopa Libertadores, 8 Copa CONMEBOL, 6 Friendly match)
|-
|Games won || 42 (16 Campeonato Paulista, 1 Recopa Sudamericana, 4 Copa Libertadores, 1 Copa Bandeirantes, 12 Campeonato Brasileiro, 3 Supercopa Libertadores, 3 Copa CONMEBOL, 2 Friendly match)
|-
|Games drawn || 26 (9 Campeonato Paulista, 0 Recopa Sudamericana, 2 Copa Libertadores, 1 Copa Bandeirantes, 8 Campeonato Brasileiro, 1 Supercopa Libertadores, 3 Copa CONMEBOL, 2 Friendly match)
|-
|Games lost || 24 (5 Campeonato Paulista, 0 Recopa Sudamericana, 2 Copa Libertadores, 4 Copa Bandeirantes, 7 Campeonato Brasileiro, 2 Supercopa Libertadores, 2 Copa CONMEBOL, 2 Friendly match)
|-
|Goals scored || 159
|-
|Goals conceded || 119
|-
|Goal difference || +40
|-
|Best result || 6 -1 (H) v Peñarol - Copa Conmebol - 1994.12.14  4–0 (H) v Ferroviária – Campeonato Paulista – 1994.02.164–0 (A) v América – Campeonato Paulista – 1994.04.244–0 (H) v Araçatuba – Copa Bandeirantes – 1994.07.294–0 (H) v Paysandu – Campeonato Brasileiro – 1994.11.06
|-
|Worst result || 0–4 (A) v Botafogo – Campeonato Brasileiro – 1994.08.20
|-
|Most appearances || 
|-
|Top scorer || Palhinha (20)
|-

Friendlies

Trofeo Club Atlético San Lorenzo de Almagro

Taça Solidariedade

Friendly match held for the collection of warm clothes.

Official competitions

Campeonato Paulista

League table

Matches

Record

Recopa Sudamericana

Record

Copa Libertadores

Eightfinals

Quarterfinals

Semifinals

Finals

Record

Copa Bandeirantes

Record

Campeonato Brasileiro

First round

Matches

Second round

First phase

Matches

Second phase

Matches

Second round table

Quarterfinals

Record

Supercopa Sudamericana

Eightfinals

Quarterfinals

Semifinals

Record

Copa CONMEBOL

Eightfinals

Quarterfinals

Semifinals

Finals

Record

External links
official website

References

Sao Paulo
São Paulo FC seasons